Hidden champions are relatively small but highly successful companies that are concealed behind a curtain of inconspicuousness, invisibility, and sometimes secrecy. The term was coined by Hermann Simon. He first used the term as a title of a publication in a scientific German management journal, describing the small, highly specialized world-market leaders in Germany. According to his definition, a company must meet three criteria to be considered a hidden champion:

 Number one, two, or three in the global market, or number one on the company's continent, determined by market share
 Revenue below $5 billion
 Low level of public awareness

Discovering hidden champions 

The first English book about the subject was Hermann Simon's Hidden champions: lessons from 500 of the world's best unknown companies. The book explores how Germany was able to consistently be (at the time) the number one exporter in the world. While Germany has global corporations like Volkswagen, Siemens, BASF and Bosch, these organisations are not substantially different from organisations like Ford, GE, DuPont or Visteon. Simon postulates that Germany's strong exports are supported by a large number of midsize firms. These smaller companies are normally known only in their market by their customers and suppliers, and are relatively unknown to the wider public. When these companies are very successful on the international markets they are hidden champions.

Simon conducted detailed research on 500 such companies and established a framework to describe them. The framework was also able to identify the main differences and traits common to hidden champions. With this framework in hand it was found that there are hidden champions everywhere around the world, but they are most frequently found in German speaking countries.

Success factors 
Most of the hidden champions produce inconspicuous products. In the market for these products they are the top producer in the world.  Often, but not always, these companies are family owned.  They export most of their products, and so contribute significantly to the current account of their countries, and are more successful than the average.

The idea of market leadership means more than counting market share. Leaders as employees need an "inner flame" to become, and to remain, the number one. Hidden champions normally work in niche markets. For these markets they design unique products, which are produced with a high real net output ratio. They have to accept the risk of being a single product manufacturer. They divide between "good" and "bad" market share. The good is earned by performance and a solid foundation, the bad from price aggression and discounting.

One result of working with unique products in niche markets is quite often the need to deal on the global market in order to achieve economies of scale. For this reason, hidden champions feel a strong need to work abroad early in their company's development. Hidden champions also operate extremely close to their customers, and their customers' needs are an important driver for their innovations. On the other hand, customers of hidden champions depend on their products and they cannot easily change their source.  This often makes for a high level of co-dependence between the producer and the customer, a result of the one product risk.

A lot of the hidden champions established their main product as an innovation and were able to keep this single position in the market, or were at least able to keep a leading position. Their markets are mostly oligopolistic with intense competition.

Competitive advantages of hidden champions are rarely because of cost leadership, more because of quality, total cost of ownership, high performance, and consultation close to the customer. They "earn" their market leadership through performance and not through price aggression. Their high real net output ratio is often achieved by working with proprietary processes which make it hard for competitors to imitate their products. On the other hand, management tasks like finance are often outsourced.

It also seems to be evident that to maintain market leadership hidden champions do business on their own, rather than depend on working in cooperation with others. Even sales in countries abroad are often organized from the parent company base. This keeps significant know-how inside, and helps recruit highly qualified staff at a small company.

The corporate culture of hidden champions is distinctive. Their values are conservative: hard work, strict selection, intolerance of underperformance, low sickness rates and high employee loyalty — and most are based in smaller towns.

Leadership style is authoritarian on strategic issues but participative on operations level. The leaders identify themselves with the company, are focused on their products, and stay for a long time, much longer than is normal in large public corporations.

A serious problem for hidden champions, as it is for SMEs in general, is to attract international professionals. Hidden champions need people who are happy to live in a remote location, who are attracted by job content, and who do not care much for a formal and prescribed career path. In Germany the concept of hidden champion is known to some extent, and therefore hidden champions there are able to utilise this label to recruit staff.  In 2011, the first "Hidden Champions Day" was organized by the student initiative bdvb e.V. at the University of Mannheim in order to promote the advantages and opportunities of working for a SME.

Lessons to be learned from hidden champions 
Hidden champions provide a best practice example. While a lot of business is local, it can be a goal to become the number one on such a local market. Also large companies may find some interesting lessons about international management. Hidden champions teach that exceptional management means doing small things better than the competitors instead of managing only one great thing. Simplicity in processes and organizational structures is another lesson. Investors may find determined, clearly focused, continuously successful companies.

The idea and adaptation of hidden champions was implemented in a fund called Hidden Champions Fund, founded in Singapore by 8I Holdings Ltd.

List of selected hidden champions 
This list of companies selected by Hermann Simon in 2009 gives an idea of what hidden champions are:

 3B Scientific (anatomical teaching aids)
 ARCITECTA (data management platform)
 ARRI (cinema cameras)
 Belfor (removal of fire and water damages)
 Beluga Shipping (heavy-lift shipping company; insolvent)
 Bobcat Company (farm and construction equipment)
 Brainlab (medical software and hardware) 
 Corticeira Amorim (cork products)
 De La Rue (security printing, papermaking and cash handling systems)
 DELO Industrie Klebstoffe (adhesives for chip cards)
 Embraer (regional jets)
 Dickson Constant (technical textiles for blinds, truck sheeting etc.)
 Enercon (wind turbines)
 EOS GmbH (rapid prototyping systems)
 Essel Propack (tubes for toothpaste)
 Friwo Gerätebau GmbH (charging devices, power supplies, led drivers, battery packs)
 Josef Gartner GmbH (facades for skyscrapers, subsidiary of Permasteelisa)
 Gallagher Group Limited (electric fencing, livestock, weighing equipment)
 Hans Gerriets (single manufacturer of large stage curtains)
 Hamamatsu Photonics (optical sensors including photomultiplier tubes)
 Heraeus Electro-Nite (measurement, monitoring and control of molten metal processes)
 HiFi-Tuning (developing, engineering of finest fuses, out of pure silver and gold)
 Höganäs AB (powdered metals)
 International SOS (medical assistance, health-care, security and risk management services)
 Jamba!/Jamster (cell phone ring tones)
 Austrian Jungbunzlauer (sodium acetate)
 Klais Orgelbau (large organs)
 Swiss Lantal Textiles (cabins for passenger aircraft)
 McIlhenny Company (Tabasco sauce)
 Molex (electronic components, including electrical and fiber optic)
 NetJets (fractional ownership and rental of private business jets)
 Nissha Printing (small touch panels)
 Nivarox (regulating mechanism inside wristwatches)
 Nordischer Maschinenbau Rud. Baader (supplier of fish processing systems)
 Omicron NanoTechnology (scanning probe and tunnel-grid microscopes)
 Orica (industrial explosives)
 PERI GmbH (formwork and scaffolding)
 Petzl (climbing gear, caving gear, work-at-height equipment)
 Phoenix Contact (terminal blocks, connectors, interface solutions, industrial automation)
 PLANSEE (high performance materials)
 Q-Cells (solar energy, solar cells)
 Radiall (electronic interconnect components)
 Sachtler (tripods for movie cameras)
 SAES Getters (Getter producer)
 Sappi (coated fine paper)
 Schwank (industrial heating)
 SGS, Société Générale de Surveillance (inspection, verification, testing and certification services)
 Tandberg and Polycom (videoconferencing systems)
 O.C. Tanner (employee recognition programs)
 Technogym (fitness equipment)
 Tetra (aquarium and pond supplies)
 ULVAC Technologies (vacuum technology)
 Universo S.A. (wristwatch hands)
 W.E.T. (car seat heating)
 Webasto (remote-controlled heaters for cars)
 Worldwide.energy (green energy)
 Zimmer Holdings, DePuy, Biomet, and Stryker Corporation (all implants, and located in the area of Warsaw, Indiana)

References

Further reading

Books and papers
Audretsch, David B., Lehmann, Erik E., & Schenkenhofer, Julian (2018). Internationalization strategies of hidden champions: lessons from Germany. Multinational Business Review, 26(1), 2-24.
 Fryges, Helmut: Hidden champions : how young and small technology oriented firms can attain high export sales ratios. Mannheim : Zentrum für Europ. Wirtschaftsforschung, 2006.
 Hanna, Rosemary: Hidden champions of the B. C. forest industry : are small firms at the cutting edge of value chain innovation? Ottawa : Library and Archives Canada, 2007. - .
 Langenscheidt, Florian (Ed.), Venohr, Bernd (Ed.): The Best of German Mittelstand - THE WORLD MARKET LEADERS. DAAB Verlag, Cologne 2015, .
Merrilees, Bill; Blackburn, Jillian; Tiessen, James; Lindman, Martti: Hidden (SME) Champions : The Role of Innovation and Strategy. In: Chetty, Sylvia (Ed.); Collins, Brett (Ed.): Proceedings of the Australian and New Zealand Marketing Academy Conference 1–5 December 2001. Auckland: College of Business, Massey University: 2001.
 Neubauer, Regina: Business models in the area of logistics : in search of hidden champions, their business principles and common industry misperceptions. Wiesbaden: Gabler, 2010. - 
 Simon, Hermann: Hidden champions : lessons from 500 of the world's best unknown companies. Boston (Mass.): Harvard Business School Press, 1996.- .
 Simon, Hermann: Lehren der Hidden Champions des 21. Jahrhunderts. In: Weissman, Arnold: Erfolgreich mit den Großen des Managements. Frankfurt a. M.: Campus, 2008.- . S. 109-147.
 Simon, Hermann: Hidden Champions of the 21st Century : Success Strategies of unknown World Market Leaders. London: Springer, 2009.- .
 Venohr, Bernd; Meyer, Klaus: The German Miracle Keeps Running : How Germany’s Hidden Champions Stay Ahead in the Global Economy Berlin: Working Paper No. 30, Institute of Management Berlin, Berlin School of Economics, 2007.
 Venohr, Bernd; Meyer, Klaus: Uncommon common sense Business Strategy Review, Volume 20, issue 1, Spring 2009, p. 39-43
 Voeth, Markus ; Herbst, Uta ; Barisch, Sina: Hidden Champion Region Stuttgart : Ergebnisse einer empirischen Untersuchung. Stuttgart : Förderverein für Marketing an der Universität Hohenheim, 2008.
 Witt, Alessa: Internationalisation of hidden champions : market entry and timing strategies with international management and business ethics cases. Hamburg: Management Laboratory, 2010. -

External links
 Whiteboard: guest article by Prof. Hermann Simon on the 13 management principles behind Hidden Champions, Dec. 2012
 Whiteboard: guest article by Prof. Hermann Simon on the socio-economic factors that shaped the 'Hidden Champions', Jan. 2013
Business Week, JANUARY 26, 2004.
stimmt., Friday, July 31, 2009
inchina, 2009-09-14
The Korea Times: 2009-28-04, 2010-28-04
Japan's Hidden Champions Hold the Key to Revitalization of Regional Economies, 2009
High cost Germany shows how to succeed in exporting, 11-01-31
Benchmarking and Hidden Champion to promote local development : Tools description and their application

Types of business entity